William Alexander (died 1446), of Salisbury and Winterbourne Cherborough, Wiltshire, was an English politician.

He was a Member (MP) of the Parliament of England for Wiltshire in 1415 and for Salisbury in 1423, 1425, 1427, 1431 and 1432.

References

14th-century births
1446 deaths
People from Wiltshire
English MPs 1423
English MPs 1425
English MPs 1427
English MPs 1431
English MPs 1432